Federal common law is a term of United States law used to describe common law that is developed by the federal courts, instead of by the courts of the various states. The United States is the only country to combine the creation of common law doctrines with a complete federalism, wherein the national supreme court has virtually no power to review state court decisions to determine whether the state courts have followed state laws. The High Court of Australia is sometimes said to have federal common law, but because all state and territorial courts are directly appealable to the High Court, this is indistinguishable from a general common law. In contrast, the United States Supreme Court has effectively barred the creation of federal common law in areas traditionally under the authority of state courts. Nevertheless, there are several areas where federal common law continues to govern.

The Swift doctrine
Until 1938, federal courts in the United States followed the doctrine set forth in the 1842 case of Swift v. Tyson. In that case, the U.S. Supreme Court held that federal courts hearing cases brought under their diversity jurisdiction (allowing them to hear cases between parties from different U.S. states) had to apply the statutory law of the states, but not the common law developed by state courts. Instead, the Supreme Court permitted the federal courts to make their own common law based on general principles of law.

The reasoning behind the decision in Swift v. Tyson was that the federal courts would craft a superior common law, and the states would choose to adopt it. This hope was not fulfilled, however, as the principles of various states' common law continued to dramatically diverge. Some litigants began to abuse the availability of the federal courts for the specific purpose of having cases decided under the federal common law principles.

The Erie doctrine
In 1938, the Supreme Court decided Erie Railroad v. Tompkins. Erie overruled Swift v. Tyson, holding instead that federal courts exercising diversity jurisdiction had to use all of the same substantive laws as the courts of the states in which they were located. As the Erie Court put it, there is no "federal general common law", with the operative word being "general".

The Erie decision did not put an end to other types of federal common law. Several areas of federal common law remain, in two basic categories: areas where Congress has given the courts power to develop substantive law, and areas where a federal rule of decision is necessary to protect uniquely federal interests.

The U.S. Congress has given courts power to formulate common law rules in areas such as admiralty law, antitrust, bankruptcy law, interstate commerce, and civil rights. Congress often lays down broad mandates with vague standards, which are then left to the courts to interpret, and these interpretations eventually give rise to complex understandings of the original intent of Congress, informed by the courts' understanding of what is just and reasonable.

Furthermore, in the 1943 case of Clearfield Trust Co. v. United States, the Court recognized that federal courts could still create federal common law, albeit in limited circumstances where federal or Constitutional interests were at stake, Congress had inadequately addressed the situation sub judice, and the application of individual state laws in various jurisdictions would create unacceptable levels of diversity or uncertainty. When fashioning new federal common law, the Court may either adopt a reasonable state law, look to its own precedent, or create new law.

Congressional repeal of federal common law

Federal common law is valid only to the extent that Congress has not repealed the common law. The Supreme Court has explained that, "when Congress addresses a question previously governed by a decision resting on federal common law, the need for such an unusual exercise of law-making by federal courts disappears."

During the era when the Constitution was written, it was understood that common law was alterable by legislatures. For example, Alexander Hamilton emphasized in The Federalist Papers that the New York Constitution made the common law subject "to such alterations and provisions as the legislature shall from time to time make concerning the same." Thus, even when a federal court has authority to make common law, that law is subject to alteration by Congress. This principle finds expression in the first sentence of the Constitution: "All legislative Powers herein granted shall be vested in a Congress of the United States, which shall consist of a Senate and House of Representatives."

Federal criminal common law
In the Virginia Senate debate over ratification of the Bill of Rights, Senator George Mason objected to the words "Congress shall make no law" in the First Amendment, on the grounds that "arbitrary decisions of judges" might violate those same rights.  However, the U.S. Supreme Court stated in the 1812 case of United States v. Hudson that there could be no federal criminal common law.

Federal practice litigation 
All fifty states have both state and federal courts. Federal courts have jurisdiction over matters of federal concern, meaning federal law and in particular federal law that pre-empts state law when an issue is within the federal government’s exclusive domain. The other type of jurisdiction conferred upon federal courts is known as diversity jurisdiction and it exists where the amount in controversy is greater than $75,000.00 and no defendant is a citizen of the same state as any of the plaintiffs in the case (complete diversity).

References